The Benelli Argo rifle is manufactured by Italian arms manufacturer Benelli Armi SpA. It is produced in two versions: the basic Argo version with a black anodised receiver and the Argo Special with a nickel-plated receiver.

Design details
The Benelli Argo has a rotating bolt head with three lugs, which combine to provide an effective locking surface. The fully tempered steel cover is equipped with holes for attaching scopes and is firmly connected to the barrel. This results in a greater accuracy at range. The free-moving barrel gives greater precision more akin to bolt-action models.

The plate kit used to adjust stock deviation and drop, together with the interchangeable sights, make the Benelli Argo and Argo Special rifles versatile and multi-purpose.

See also
 Benelli Argo Comfortech
 Benelli Argo EL

External links
 Official homepage - Italy
 Official homepage - USA

Semi-automatic rifles